Omorgus aphanocephalus is a species of hide beetle in the subfamily Omorginae.

References

aphanocephalus
Beetles described in 1986